Marian Langiewicz, full name Marian Antoni Melchior Langiewicz (5 August 1827, in Krotoszyn – 11 May 1887, in Istanbul), was a Polish patriot notable as a military leader of the January Uprising in 1863.

Biography
He was born in the province of Posen, his father being the local doctor. Langiewicz was educated at Posen, Breslau and Prague, and was compelled to earn his daily bread by giving lectures.

He subsequently entered the Prussian Landwehr and served for a year in the royal guard. In 1860 he migrated to Paris and was for a time professor in the high school founded there by Ludwik Adam Mieroslawski.

The same year he took part in Giuseppe Garibaldi's Neapolitan campaign, and was then a professor in the military school at Cuneo till the establishment was closed.

In 1862 he entered into communication with the central Polish committee at Warsaw, and on the outbreak of the insurrection, 22 January 1863, he took the command of the armed bands.

He defeated the Russians at Wąchock and Słupia (February), capturing 1000 muskets and 8 cannon. This victory drew hundreds of young recruits to his standard, till at last he had 12,000 men at his disposal.

On 23 February he again defeated the Russians, at Małogoszcz, and captured 500 muskets and 2 cannons. On 10 March he proclaimed himself Dictator and attempted to form a regular government; but either he had insufficient organizing talent, or had not time enough to carry out his plans, and after a fresh series of engagements at the battle of Chrobrze on 17 March and battle of Grochowiska on 18 March he took refuge in Austrian territory and was interned at Tarnów. He was subsequently transferred to the fortress of Josephstadt, from which he was released in 1865.

He then lived at Solothurn as a citizen of the Swiss Republic, and subsequently entered the Turkish service as Langie Bey. He died in Istanbul on 10 May 1887 and is buried at the Haidar Pasha Cemetery with his English wife Suzanne (2 February 1837 - 24 November 1906).

Sources and references
 
 See Boleslaw Limanowski, The National Insurrection of 1863-64 (Pol.) (Lemberg, 1900); Paulo Mazzolcni, I Bergamaschi in Polonia net 1863 (Bergamo, 1893); W. H. Bavink, De Poolsche opstand 1863, &c. (Haarlein, 1864).

1827 births
1887 deaths
People from Krotoszyn
19th-century Ottoman military personnel
Generals of the January Uprising
Burials at Haydarpaşa Cemetery